Óscar Prats Català (born 25 March 1989) is a Spanish professional footballer who plays for CF La Nucía as a right back.

Career
Born in Llutxent, Prats graduated from the youth academy of Real Madrid. He started his senior career with the reserves of Villarreal, initially with the Villarreal CF C before being promoted to the B team in 2008. His only appearance for the latter came in 2010, featuring in a 1–2 defeat against Salamanca in the Segunda División. On 27 August 2010, he was loaned off to Segunda División B side CP Cacereño for a year.

On 21 July 2011, Prats signed with CD Roquetas of the same tier. In the only season he played with the club, he managed to make 33 appearances. In the following two seasons, he represented UD Alzira which competed in the Tercera División. 

On 12 July 2014, Prats signed for CF Talavera de la Reina, becoming the club's sixth signing of the season. He was ruled out of play for two weeks in November 2015 after being elbowed by a La Roda CF player which broke the bones of his nose. On 8 June 2018, he switched to Barakaldo CF.

Career statistics

References

External links

1989 births
Living people
Association football defenders
Spanish footballers
Segunda División B players
Tercera División players
Segunda División players
Villarreal CF C players
Villarreal CF B players
CP Cacereño players
CD Roquetas footballers
UD Alzira footballers
CF Talavera de la Reina players
Barakaldo CF footballers
UE Cornellà players
CF La Nucía players